Isn't She Great is a 2000 biographical comedy-drama film that presents a fictionalized biography of author Jacqueline Susann, played by Bette Midler. An international co-production between the United States, the United Kingdom, Germany, and Japan, the film was directed by Andrew Bergman from a screenplay by Paul Rudnick based on a 1995 New Yorker profile by Michael Korda. The film covers Susann's entire life, focusing on her early struggles as an aspiring actress relentlessly hungry for fame, her relationship with press agent husband Irving Mansfield (Nathan Lane), with whom she had an institutionalized autistic son, her success as the author of Valley of the Dolls, and her battle with and subsequent death from breast cancer. In addition to Midler and Lane, the film stars Stockard Channing as Susann's "gal pal" Florence Maybelle, David Hyde Pierce as book editor Michael Hastings, and John Cleese as publisher Henry Marcus. John Larroquette, Amanda Peet, Christopher McDonald, Debbie Shapiro, and Paul Benedict have supporting roles.

Opening in 750 US theaters on January 28, 2000, it received negative reviews from critics and earned only $3 million at the box office, far less than its cost of $44 million. Midler was nominated for a Worst Actress Golden Raspberry Award.

Cast 
Bette Midler as Jacqueline Susann
Nathan Lane as Irving Mansfield
Stockard Channing as Florence Maybelle
David Hyde Pierce as Michael Hastings
John Cleese as Henry Marcus
Amanda Peet as Debbie Klausman
John Larroquette as Maury Manning
Christopher McDonald as Brad Bradburn
Dina Spybey as Bambi Madison
Larry Block as Herbie
Frank Vincent as Aristotle Onassis
James Villemaire as Jim Morrison
Paul Benedict as Prof. Brainiac
Sam Street as Truman Capote

Production
The film was an international production, with the BBC, Lobell-Bergman Productions, Marbeni, Mutual Film Corporation, Tele München, Toho and Universal Pictures contributing, making it an American-British-German-Japanese co-production. Despite the international production, the film was not released in Japan.

Reception 
Isn't She Great was panned by critics, as the film holds a 25% rating on Rotten Tomatoes based on 61 reviews. The site's consensus states, "Bland material produces entirely forgettable comic performances."

Awards and nominations

Nominations 
Razzie Awards: Worst Actress (Bette Midler)

Footnotes

References

External links 
 
New York Times review
San Francisco Chronicle review
Roger Ebert review
Rotten Tomatoes

2000 films
2000s English-language films
English-language German films
English-language Japanese films
2000 comedy-drama films
American biographical films
American comedy-drama films
British biographical films
British comedy-drama films
German biographical films
German comedy-drama films
Japanese biographical films
Japanese comedy-drama films
Biographical films about writers
Cultural depictions of Aristotle Onassis
Cultural depictions of Jim Morrison
Cultural depictions of Truman Capote
Films based on newspaper and magazine articles
Films directed by Andrew Bergman
Films scored by Burt Bacharach
Films with screenplays by Paul Rudnick
Mutual Film Company films
Universal Pictures films
2000s American films
2000s British films
2000s Japanese films
2000s German films
Films about disability